KAAN-FM (95.5 MHz) is a commercial FM radio station broadcasting a country music radio format.  Licensed to Bethany, Missouri, United States, the station is currently owned by Alpha Media and features programming from Westwood One.

KAAN-FM first signed on the air on October 27, 1978.  The transmitter tower is located six miles west of Bethany on U.S. Route 136 at West 140th Avenue.  KAAN-FM has an effective radiated power (ERP) of 50,000 watts.  It covers much of Northwestern Missouri and some of Southern Iowa.

Ownership
On March 1, 2007, it was announced that GoodRadio.TV LLC planned to buy The Shepherd Group of radio stations in Missouri.  The Shepherd Group operated 16 small-market radio stations in Missouri.  The deal was reportedly worth $30.6 million.

Dean Goodman formed the new company, GoodRadio.TV.  He is the former president and chief executive officer of the television broadcasting company ION Media Networks Inc.  Goodman stepped down from ION Media Networks in October 2006.

The Shepherd Group included KJEL-FM and KBNN in Lebanon; KJFF in Festus; KREI and KTJJ in Farmington; KRES and KWIX in Moberly; KIRK in Macon; KIIK, KOZQ-FM, KJPW and KFBD-FM in Waynesville; KAAN-FM and KAAN in Bethany; and KMRN and KKWK in Cameron.

In December 2013, GoodRadio.TV merged into Digity, LLC. Effective February 25, 2016, Digity and its 124 radio stations were acquired by Alpha Media for $264 million.

References

External links

AAN-FM
Country radio stations in the United States
Radio stations established in 1978
Alpha Media radio stations